Héctor Abad Faciolince (born 1958) is a Colombian novelist, essayist, journalist, and editor. Abad is considered one of the most talented post-Latin American Boom writers in Latin American literature. Abad is best known for his bestselling novel Angosta, and more recently, El Olvido que Seremos (t. Oblivion: A Memoir).

Background

Héctor Joaquín Abad Faciolince was born and raised in Medellín (Colombia), the only boy -among five sisters- of Cecilia Faciolince and Héctor Abad Gómez. Abad's father was a prominent medical doctor, university professor, and human rights leader whose holistic vision of healthcare led him to found the Colombian National School of Public Health.

After graduating from an Opus Dei-run private Catholic school, Abad moved to Mexico City in 1978 where his father was appointed as Cultural Counselor of the Colombian Embassy in Mexico. While in Mexico, he attended literature, creative writing and poetry workshops at La Casa del Lago, the first off campus cultural center of the National Autonomous University of Mexico.

In 1979, Abad moved back to Medellín and pursued studies in Philosophy and Literature at the Universidad Pontificia Bolivariana. Later in 1982, he was expelled from the University for writing an irreverent article against the Pope. He then moved to Italy and completed studies on Modern Languages and Literature at the University of Turin in 1986. Abad graduated with the highest academic honors of summa cum laude, and his thesis on Guillermo Cabrera Infante's 1967 novel Tres tristes tigres was also awarded "Dignitá di Stampa" (a special distinction that literally means "worthy of publication").

Abad returned to his home town in Colombia in 1987, but later that year his father was murdered by the paramilitaries in a crime that brought about shock in Colombia. Abad himself was threatened with death and had to fly back immediately to Europe; first to Spain and finally to Italy, where he established his residence for the next five years. While in Italy, Abad worked as a lecturer of Spanish at the University of Verona until 1992. At this time, he also earned a living translating literary works from Italian to Spanish. His translations of Giuseppe Tomasi di Lampedusa’s The Siren and Selected Writings, Gesualdo Bufalino’s Qui Pro Quo and Umberto Eco’s Annotations to The Name of the Rose have been well received critically. He has also translated numerous works by Italo Calvino, Leonardo Sciascia, Primo Levi, and Natalia Ginzburg. Upon returning to Colombia, Abad was appointed director of the University of Antioquia Journal (1993–1997). Abad has been columnist for prestigious newspapers and magazines in Colombia, such as Revista Cromos, La Hoja, El Malpensante, Revista Semana, and Revista Cambio, the last co-founded by the Nobel Prize–winning Colombian author Gabriel García Márquez. He has also worked as a journalist for the newspapers El Mundo, El Colombiano, and El Espectador. He is a regular contributor to other Latin American and Spanish papers and magazines.

Abad has been a guest speaker at a number of universities worldwide, including Columbia University, Pennsylvania State University, University of Verona, University of Turin, University of Cagliari, University of Bologna, and University of Florence. He has also been seasonal lecturer at the Università del Piemonte Orientale in Vercelli. Awarded the prestigious German Academic Exchange Service (DAAD) fellowship, Abad lived in Berlin from 2006 to 2007. He later returned to Medellín and was appointed editor-in-chief of the EAFIT University Press. Since May 2008, Abad has been a member of the editorial board of El Espectador, the oldest newspaper in Colombia. In 2014 he was the 31st Samuel Fischer Visiting Professor at the Peter Szondi Institute of Comparative Literature at the Free University of Berlin, where he taught a seminar entitled "Literature and Violence".

Abad is an atheist.

Writing

Abad started his literary career at a very young age. He was just 12 years old when he wrote his first short stories and poetry works. Abad was twenty one years of age when he was awarded the 1980 Colombian National Short Story Prize for Piedras de Silencio (t. Stones of Silence), a short story about a miner trapped deep underground. While still in Italy, he published his first book, Malos Pensamientos (1991) but it was only upon returning to Colombia in 1993, that Abad become a full-time writer.

Abad forms part of a new generation of authors that emerges in Colombia beyond magical realism. Among a notably circle of new Colombian writers such as Santiago Gamboa, Jorge Franco, Laura Restrepo, and others(1), Abad's literary works often focus on the personality of the narrator and the act of narration in its pursuit of protection and power. The richness, plot, irony, permanent enticement of the reader, the intensity of his stories, as well as the seriousness of the social, historical, and human research behind his confessional narrative, stand Abad as a brilliant recreator of the contemporary Colombian society through literature.

Malos Pensamientos (1991) is a sort of James Joyce’s Dubliners short tales that offer vivid, witty, and tightly focused observations of Medellín's everyday life back in the eighties.

Asuntos de un Hidalgo Disoluto (1994; Eng. The Joy of Being Awake, 1996) deliberately models itself on two key 18th-century works: Laurence Sterne's Tristram Shandy and Voltaire's Candide. Like Sterne's eccentric novel, The Joy of Being Awake is a bittersweet account of the life and opinions of a man at odds with himself, narrated in nonchronological fashion with plenty of entertaining digressions and the occasional formal game. Narrated by a character who is a 71-year-old Colombian millionaire, this work is a Colombian version of the Spanish picaresque novel. Writing at the end of his life, the narrator looks back on his life of debauchery – and the failure of his high pretensions – through reminiscences to his younger mute secretary and lover, Cunegunda Bonaventura. The narrator often gives two versions of a memory: first what he wishes had happened and then what really happened. Abad's novel has a surface geniality that barely conceals undercurrents of discontent and despair.(2) This novel is considered as one of the better works of fiction to appear recently in Colombia.

Tratado de Culinaria para Mujeres Tristes (1996; t: Recipes for Sad Women) is a book of uncertain literary genre that combines a collection of false recipes (coelacanth, dinosaur, or mammoth meat) with real recipes. The book is neither a novel nor a collection of recipes, but rather a collection of sensitive short reflections about unhappiness. With a love for droll turns of phrase, Abad blends melancholy with even-seasoned irony in well-composed sentences.

Fragmentos de Amor Furtivo (1998; t: Fragments of Furtive Love). adopts the framework of the book of One Thousand and One Nights in modified form. Every night, a woman delays her lover's departure by telling him stories of her past lovers. As a background, Abad portraits a 1990s middle-class Medellín as a city besieged by pestilence and disenchantment, the most violent city in the world, where the intensity of violence buried its inhabitants alive. As in the Decameron, Susana and Rodrigo lock themselves up in the hills, far away from the city pestilence, and tell each other stories that would save them from death.

Basura (2000; t: Garbage) is perhaps Abad's most experimental work. It alludes to role models, such as the storytellers Kafka or Pavese who were angst ridden for life, and tells of a writer, Bernardo Davanzati, who tosses his works directly into the garbage can. His neighbour finds the texts and over time turns into an assiduous and diligent reader, to whom the many woes of being a writer are revealed. The act of writing and the role of the reader in literature are topics which are highlighted time and again.

Palabras sueltas (2002; t. Loose Words) is a book of brief cultural and political essays that were compiled from Abad's most successful columns written for newspapers and cultural magazines.

Oriente Empieza en El Cairo (2002; t. East begins in Cairo) is a fascinating chronicle of a man's voyage around the millenary Egypt. The narrator, accompanied by two wives, depicts two versions of the everyday reality of a mythical mega-city that brings memories of other realities, images, and stories lived in distant Medellín.

Angosta (2004). Echoes of Hyperrealism rather than Magic Realism are clearly present in this award-winning novel. In a fantastical parable of Colombian society, Abad describes a fictitious city whose population has been divided into three different castes living in separate sectors. Against the backdrop of the violent perpetuation of this system, a kaleidoscope of eccentrics from the ruling class is depicted. The novel recreates Colombia's last years of violence with enormous synthetic capacity, complexity and efficiency, and a great deal of knowledge about the conflict. Abad provides us with one of the very best novels on the second wave of violence during the twentieth century in Colombia.(4) In March 2007, the Colombian magazine Semana published a list of the best work of fiction written in Spanish over the last 25 years. Among the thirty books to have received multiple votes was Abad's Angosta.

El Olvido que Seremos (2006; t. Oblivion: A Memoir). It took Abad nearly 20 years to get the courage to write this book about his father, his life and the circumstances of his murder by Colombian paramilitaries. The result is a cathartic and sentimental—but not clichéd—account of a man who fought against oppression, and social inequality and whose voice was shut down by six bullets in the head. The narration itself—which focuses more on the father’s activism and the father figure per se than on the man himself—was a process for the author; Abad goes beyond memory, opening up his own feelings and responses to his loss and depicts his father as the symbol of the ongoing fight against injustice, thus, illuminating and strengthening the Colombian memory.

Las Formas de la Pereza y Otros Ensayos (2007; t. The Forms of Laziness and Other Essays) is a book about the origin and manifestations of laziness. The author’s hypothesis is that laziness would not be a luxury but the original condition of human existence, and the starting point of all subsequent human creations.

An extensive bibliography about his writings has been prepared by Professor Augusto Escobar Mesa from the University of Antioquia, and the Université de Montréal.

Columnist 
Abad started to write in Newspapers and Magazines since he was in school and later when he was in college. After college, he wrote in newspapers such as El Espectador and continued for more than 15 years. In Abad's writings, one can see his incisive character when writing about controversial subjects such as globalization, religion, corruption, etc. Jiménez confirms that one can see the reoccurring themes in Abad's columns, which are: rhetoric, personal themes, writing jobs, literary structures, phobias, science, against globalization, Medellín and religion.

In the newspaper El Espectador, Abad publishes a weekly column where he clearly expresses his opinion. By doing this, he allows one to see sections that talk about writing and grammar in the 21st century

Abad, in collaborations in literature magazines like El Malpensante, exhibits his critical view of literature, what he considers to be a good writer and a good book. One can find articles like Por qué es tan malo Paulo Coelho, where one can infer things such as:

If Coelho sells more books than all of the other Brazilian writers combined, then that means his books are foolish and elementary. If they were profound books, literarily complex, with serious ideas and well elaborated, the public would not buy them because the masses tend to be uneducated and have very bad taste.

Abad does not try to be a best-seller but creates complete characters like Gaspar Medina in the novel Asuntos de un hidalgo disoluto, where one can see Medina's periodization of being a hidalgo and dissolute. Or, likewise, explain relevant themes like in his novel Angosta where it "takes elements of actual Colombian reality like poverty, subjects of economics and politics, subversive groups, etc. later for parody and exaggeration in the near future."

Reception

 1980. Colombian National Short Story Prize for Piedras de Silencio
 1996. National Creative Writing Scholarship; Colombian Ministry of Culture for Fragmentos de Amor Furtivo.
 1998. Simón Bolívar National Prize in Journalism.
 2000. 1st Casa de America Award for Innovative American Narrative for Basura.
 2004. Best Spanish Language Book of the Year (People's Republic of China) for Angosta.
 2006. German Academic Exchange Service (DAAD) fellowship.
 2007. National Book Award; Libros & Letras Latin American and Colombian Cultural Magazine for El Olvido que Seremos.
 2007. Simón Bolívar National Prize in Journalism.
 2010. Casa de America Latina, Lisboa
 2012. WOLA-Duke University Human Rights Book Award

Published works

 Malos Pensamientos (1991)
 Asuntos de un Hidalgo Disoluto (1994; Eng. The Joy of Being Awake, 1996)
 Tratado de Culinaria para Mujeres Tristes (1996; t: Cookbook for Sad Women)
 Fragmentos de Amor Furtivo (1998; t: Fragments of Furtive Love)
 Basura (2000; t: Garbage)
 Palabras Sueltas (2002; t: Loose Words)
 Oriente Empieza en El Cairo (2002)
 Angosta (2004)
 El Olvido que Seremos (2006; The Oblivion We Shall Be)(Published in the United States as Oblivion, 2012)
 Las Formas de la Pereza y Otros Ensayos (2007; t: The Forms of Laziness and Other Essays)
 El Amanecer de un Marido (2008; t: The Awakening of a Husband)
 Traiciones de la Memoria (2009; t: Treasons of Memory)
 Testamento involuntario (2011, poetry)
 La Oculta (2014, novel)
 Lo que fue presente (2019, diaries 1985–2006)

Translated works

English:
 1996. The Joy of Being Awake (Asuntos de un Hidalgo Disoluto), pub. by Brookline Books in the US
 2010. Oblivion: A Memoir (El olvido que seremos), pub. by Old Street Publishing in the UK, and in 2012 by Farrar, Straus and Giroux in the US (2012)
 2012. Recipes for Sad Women (Tratado de Culinaria para Mujeres Tristes), pub. by Pushkin Press in the UK
 2018 The Farm  (La Oculta)' Archipelago Press in the US
Italian:
 1997. Trattato di Culinaria per Donne Tristi (Tratado de Culinaria para Mujeres Tristes).
 2008. Scarti (Basura).
 2009. L'oblio che saremo (El Olvido que Seremos).
German:
 2001. Kulinarisches Traktat für traurige Frauen (Tratado de Culinaria para Mujeres Tristes).
 2009. Brief an einen Schatten: Eine Geschichte aus Kolumbien (El olvido que seremos).
 2011. Das Gedicht in der Tasche. 
 2016. La Oculta. 
Greek:
 2000. Συvtα¡έs ¡ια απо¡оntευ έs ¡υvαίkεs (Tratado de Culinaria para Mujeres Tristes)
Portuguese:
 2001. Receitas de Amor para Mulheres Tristes (Tratado de Culinaria para Mujeres Tristes).
 2001. Fragmentos de Amor Furtivo (Fragmentos de Amor Furtivo).
 2009. Somos o Esquecimento que Seremos (El Olvido que Seremos).
 2011. A Ausência que seremos (Companhia das Letras)
 2012. Livro de receitas para mulheres tristes 
 2012. Os Dias de Davanzati (Basura).
Chinese:
 2005. 深谷幽城 (Angosta) The four Chinese characters mean, respectively: deep, valley, faint or dim, and castle, so an attempt to a translation would be "The deep valley and the dim castle". Héctor Abad Faciolince's name is rendered in Chinese as 埃克托尔·阿瓦德·法西奥林塞.
Dutch:
 2010. Het vergeten dat ons wacht (El Olvido que Seremos).
 2016. 'De geheime droom van het land'(La Oculta).
French:
 2010. L'oubli que nous serons (Gallimard)
 2010. Angosta (Lattès)
 2010. Traité culinaire à l'usage des femmes tristes (Lattès)
Arabic:
2014 النسيان (El Olvido que seremos)
Rumanian:
2014. Suntem deja uitarea ce vom fi (Curtea Veche)
Ukrainian:
2021. Ми забуття, яке настане (El Olvido que Seremos), pub. by Publishing House Compás
Turkish:
2022. Angosta , pub. by Livera Bookstore

References

(1) New Generation of Novelists Emerges in Colombia. The New York Times; 6 April (2003).
(2) Moore, Steven. "Fiction in Translation." Washington Post Book World, 22 December 1996, p. 9.
(3) Moyano Martin, D (editor). Handbook of Latin American Studies; Vol. 56. University of Texas Press (1999).
(4) Osorio, O. Poligramas 22 (2005).
(5) Jiménez, C (2006). Héctor Abad Faciolince: vida y obra de un quitapesares. Undergraduate thesis, Pontificia Universidad Javeriana. Colombia.

External links
 Testimonios sobre El Olvido que Seremos (t. Testimonies on "The Oblivion We Shall Be") Spanish. Pie de Pagina, 2007.
 Interview "La hojarasca" – # 27 – March 2007 Spanish.
 Biography of the international literature festival berlin
 "Héctor Abad Faciolince" by Catalina Quesada Gómez (published in The Contemporary Spanish American-Novel: Bolaño and After, 2013)
 Review by Mario Vargas Llosa
Héctor Abad Faciolince recorded at the Library of Congress for the Hispanic Division's audio literary archive on 24 November 2015
 Catalina Quesada y Kristine Vanden Berghe, El libro y la vida. Ensayos críticos sobre la obra de Héctor Abad Faciolince. EAFIT/Université de Liège, 2019.

1958 births
Colombian male writers
Living people
People from Medellín
University of Turin alumni
Colombian essayists
Male essayists
Colombian atheists
Colombian atheist writers
Colombian expatriates in Mexico
Colombian expatriates in Italy
Colombian expatriates in Germany